Callicoon Methodist Church and Parsonage is a historic Methodist church on Church St. in Callicoon, Sullivan County, New York.  The church was built in 1871 and the parsonage in 1889.  The church is a three-bay vernacular frame building with a central steeple tower.  The parsonage is a 2-story, three-by-two-bay, cross-gabled wood-frame building sided with white asbestos shingles.

It was added to the National Register of Historic Places in 1993.

References

Methodist churches in New York (state)
Churches on the National Register of Historic Places in New York (state)
Churches in Sullivan County, New York
National Register of Historic Places in Sullivan County, New York
Churches completed in 1871
1871 establishments in New York (state)